Drenthe is a province of the Netherlands located in the northeastern part of the country. It is bordered by Overijssel to the south, Friesland to the west, Groningen to the north, and the German state of Lower Saxony to the east.

Drenthe has been populated for 15,000 years. The region has subsequently been part of the Episcopal principality of Utrecht, Habsburg Netherlands, Dutch Republic, Batavian Republic, Kingdom of Holland and Kingdom of the Netherlands. Drenthe has been an official province since 1796. The capital and seat of the provincial government is Assen. The King's Commissioner of Drenthe is Jetta Klijnsma. The Labour Party (PvdA) is the largest party in the States-Provincial, followed by the People's Party for Freedom and Democracy (VVD) and the Christian Democratic Appeal (CDA).

Drenthe is a sparsely populated rural area, unlike many other parts of the Netherlands; except for the small cities of Assen (pop. 67,963) and Emmen (pop. 107,113), the land in Drenthe is mainly used for agriculture and it has a notable amount of forests and nature.

History

The name Drenthe is said to stem from thrija-hantja meaning "three lands".

Drenthe has been populated by people since prehistory. Artifacts from the Wolstonian Stage (150,000 years ago) are among the oldest found in the Netherlands. In fact, it was one of the most densely populated areas of the Netherlands until the Bronze Age. The most tangible evidence of this are the dolmens (hunebedden) built around 3500 BC. 53 of the 54 dolmens in the Netherlands can be found in Drenthe, concentrated in the northeast of the province. In 2006, the archaeological reserve of Strubben-Kniphorstbos, located between Anloo and Schipborg, was created to preserve part of this heritage.

Drenthe was first mentioned in a document from 820, it was called Pago Treanth (Drenthe district). In archives from Het Utrechts Archief, from 1024 to 1025, the "county Drenthe" is mentioned, when Emperor Henry II gave it to Bishop Adalbold II of Utrecht.

After long being subject to the Utrecht diocese, Bishop Henry of Wittelsbach in 1528 ceded Drenthe to Emperor Charles V of Habsburg, who incorporated it into the Habsburg Netherlands. When the Republic of the Seven United Provinces was declared in 1581, Drenthe became part of it as the County of Drenthe, although it never gained full provincial status due to its poverty; the province was so poor it was exempt from paying federal taxes and as a consequence was denied representation in the States General. The successor Batavian Republic granted it provincial status on 1 January 1796.

Shortly before the outbreak of the Second World War, the Dutch government built a camp near the town of Hooghalen to intern German Jewish refugees. During the Second World War, the German occupiers used the camp (which they named KZ Westerbork) as a Durchgangslager (transit camp). Many Dutch Jews, Sinti, Roma, resistance combatants and political adversaries were imprisoned before being transferred to concentration and extermination camps in Germany and occupied Poland. Anne Frank was deported on the last train leaving the Westerbork transit camp on 3 September 1944.

In the 1970s, there were four hostage crises where South Moluccan terrorists demanded an independent Republic of South Maluku. They held hostages in hijacked trains in 1975 and 1977, in a primary school in 1977, and in the province hall in 1978.

Geography

Drenthe is the 9th largest province of the Netherlands.

Drenthe has several heathlands and no significant rivers or lakes. The national parks Drents-Friese Wold and Dwingelderveld (IUCN category II) and the national landscape Drentsche Aa (IUCN category V) are all (partially) located in the province.

The major urban centers of the province are the capital Assen in the north and Emmen, Meppel, Hoogeveen, and Coevorden in the south.

Subdivisions 
The province (Nomenclature of Territorial Units for Statistics or NUTS level 2) is divided into three COROP regions (NUTS level 3): North Drenthe, Southeast Drenthe, and Southwest Drenthe. The COROP regions are used for statistical purposes.

The Netherlands has been subject to a large amount of municipal mergers during the last decades. Drenthe is no exception; the largest concurrent merger happened in 1998, when 32 municipalities were amalgamated into 10 larger municipalities.  Drenthe consists of 12 municipalities; Emmen is the largest municipality in terms of both population and area, Westerveld is the least populous and Meppel covers the smallest area.

The municipalities Assen, Noordenveld, and Tynaarlo are part of the interprovincial Groningen-Assen Region and the municipalities Aa en Hunze, Assen, Borger-Odoorn, Coevorden, Emmen, Midden-Drenthe, Noordenveld, and Westerveld are part of the international Ems Dollart Region (EDR).

Climate 
Drenthe has an oceanic climate (Köppen climate classification: Cfb).

Demographics 

It is the 3rd least populous and least densely populated province of the Netherlands, with only Flevoland and Zeeland having fewer people. Emmen is the most populous municipality in the province.

Religion
In 2015, 23.8% of the population belonged to the Protestant Church in the Netherlands while 9.3% was Roman Catholic, 0.9% was Muslim and 3.6% belonged to other churches or faiths. Over half (62.4%) of the population identified as non-religious.

Economy

Agriculture is an important employer, although industrial areas are found near the cities. The quietness of the province is also attracting a growing number of tourists.

Drenthe is known as the "Cycling Province" of the Netherlands and is an exceptional place for a cycling holiday, having hundreds of kilometers of cycle paths through forest, heath and along canals and many towns and villages offering refreshment along the way. Drenthe exports through the entire Netherlands and also receives supplies and goods from Germany, making it a good business district. Many Dutch and German multinational companies are settled in Drenthe.

The Gross domestic product (GDP) of the province was 15.1 billion € in 2018, accounting for 1.9% of the Netherlands economic output. GDP per capita adjusted for purchasing power was 26,700 € or 89% of the EU27 average in the same year.

Culture

Language 
Over half the population of Drenthe speaks the Drents dialect. Each town or village has its own version. All versions are part of the Low Saxon language group. Dutch Low Saxon has been officially recognised by the Dutch government as a regional language and is protected by the European Charter for Regional or Minority Languages.

Sports 
FC Emmen is the only professional football club in Drenthe. It plays in the Eredivisie and its home stadium is De Oude Meerdijk.

The Ronde van Drenthe is an elite men's and women's professional road bicycle race that takes place annually in early March.

The TT Circuit Assen hosts the Dutch TT, which is a round of the MotoGP series of the Motorcycle Road Racing World Championship.

Museums 
Drents Museum is an art and history museum in Assen. It had 227,000 visitors in 2013.

Museum Collectie Brands is a local museum located in Nieuw-Dordrecht that houses an extensive collection of rare and curious items collected by Jans Brands.

Politics 

The States of Drenthe have 41 seats, and is headed by the King's Commissioner, currently Jetta Klijnsma.  While the provincial council is elected by the people of Drenthe, the Commissioner is appointed by the King and the cabinet of the Netherlands. With 12 seats, the social democratic PvdA is the largest party in the council. The daily affairs of the province are taken care of by the Gedeputeerde Staten, which are also headed by the Commissioner; its members (gedeputeerden) can be compared with ministers.

Transportation 

The motorways A28 (E232), A32, A37 (E233), and the other major roads N33, N34, and N48 are maintained by the state.

There are four railways partially in the province of Drenthe:

Groningen Airport Eelde is a minor international airport located in Eelde in the province of Drenthe. Hoogeveen Airport is a general aviation airport located in Hoogeveen.

Science and education 

ASTRON, the Netherlands institute for radio astronomy, is located near Dwingeloo. Their single-dish radio telescope of the Dwingeloo Radio Observatory was completed in 1956 and is now a national heritage site (rijksmonument). Their Westerbork Synthesis Radio Telescope is an array of fourteen dishes near the village of Westerbork and construction was completed in 1970. Their international Low-Frequency Array with its core near Exloo was completed in 2012.

In Assen, Emmen, and Meppel are universities of applied sciences (hogescholen). The Stenden University of Applied Sciences has locations in these three towns, which formed the Drenthe University of Applied Sciences before a merger in 2008. The Hanze Institute of Technology, part of the Hanze University of Applied Sciences, is located in Assen. There are no research universities (universiteiten) in the province of Drenthe.

Media 
RTV Drenthe, the regional radio and television station, is based in Assen. The regional daily newspaper for the provinces of Drenthe and Groningen is Dagblad van het Noorden, which is based in the city of Groningen.

References

External links

 Portal Drenthe, official website

 
NUTS 2 statistical regions of the European Union
Provinces of the Netherlands